Killer Adios (also known as Killer Goodbye, Winchester Justice and Winchester One of One Thousand) is a 1968 Italian Spaghetti Western directed by Primo Zeglio.

Cast 
 Peter Lee Lawrence: Jess Bryan
 Rosalba Neri: Fanny Endes (as Sara Bay)
 Marisa Solinas: Sheila Simpson
 Armando Calvo: Bill Bragg
 Nello Pazzafini: Jack Bradshaw
 Luis Induni: Sheriff Clint Simpson
 Eduardo Fajardo: Sam Ringold
 José Jaspe: Elliott
 Victor Israel: Dixon
 Paola Barbara: Bragg's sister

Reception
Film Mese noticed how the film functioned largely as a detective film, and praised the sensual representation of actresses Solinas and Neri. Lexikon des Internationalen Films wrote: "Relatively bloodless, average spaghetti western".  Christian Kessler recommended the film as a highly enjoyable experience, even if you have already seen the ingredients of the story in other titles.

Releases
Wild East released this on a limited edition R0 NTSC DVD alongside Killer Calibre 32, also starring Peter Lee Lawrence, in 2011.

References

External links

1968 films
Spaghetti Western films
1968 Western (genre) films
Films with screenplays by José Mallorquí
1960s Italian-language films
Films directed by Primo Zeglio
1960s Italian films